Gombišče (in older sources also Gumbišče) is a small settlement in the Municipality of Trebnje in eastern Slovenia. The area is part of the historical region of Lower Carniola. The municipality is now included in the Southeast Slovenia Statistical Region. It includes the hamlet of Vrh.

Church

The local church is dedicated to Saint Bartholomew and belongs to the Parish of Veliki Gaber. It is a Gothic building remodeled in the 17th century.

References

External links

Gombišče at Geopedia

Populated places in the Municipality of Trebnje